Michael Louis Bunin (born January 14, 1970) is an American actor, known for playing the role of "Kenny" on the TBS sitcom My Boys.
He is a prolific commercial actor having starred in at least 50 national commercials. He has also guest starred on several hit TV shows including Scrubs, C.S.I., Without a Trace, Charmed, Rules of Engagement, Las Vegas. He is mostly known for his recurring role as Jeff on Superstore.

Though born in Norfolk, VA, most of his youth and young adult life was spent in the Las Vegas Valley, where he attended the University of Nevada, Las Vegas and studied theater arts. His improvisational skills were honed with studies at The Second City Players Workshop in Chicago and the famed Groundlings in Los Angeles.

External links
 

American male television actors
Living people
1970 births
Male actors from Virginia
Actors from Norfolk, Virginia
Male actors from Nevada
People from the Las Vegas Valley
University of Nevada, Las Vegas alumni
20th-century American male actors
21st-century American male actors